Cyril Saulnier (born 16 August 1975) is a retired French tennis player. In 2005, he started giving tennis lessons in places such as Heliopolis Sporting Club (Egypt). He is now director of the Proworld Tennis Academy in Delray Beach, Florida where he is a full-time coach mentoring up and coming professionals and is currently working on a trial basis with Yulia Putintseva. He is currently married with one daughter and resides in Boca Raton, Florida.

Tennis career
Saulnier reached the third round of the Canada Masters and the Paris Masters in 2004, defeating World No. 13 Dominik Hrbatý in the latter.

In the 2005 SAP Open in San Jose, he reached the final, enabling him to be ranked inside the Top 50 for the first time in his career, reaching as high as World No. 48 in March 2005.

ATP career finals

Singles: 1 (1 runner-up)

ATP Challenger and ITF Futures finals

Singles: 7 (4–3)

Doubles: 1 (0–1)

Performance timeline

Singles

References

External links
 
 

French male tennis players
French tennis coaches
People from Boca Raton, Florida
Sportspeople from Toulon
1975 births
Living people